Georges Theil (born 1940 in Corrèze), also known as Gilbert Dubreuil, is a French politician. He is a member of the National Front and was repeatedly condemned for Holocaust denial.

References 

1940 births
Living people
National Rally (France) politicians
French Holocaust deniers
Date of birth missing (living people)